Laissac-Sévérac-l'Église is a commune in the department of Aveyron, southern France. The municipality was established on 1 January 2016 by the merger of the former communes of Laissac and Sévérac-l'Église.

Population

See also
Communes of the Aveyron department

References

Communes of Aveyron
Ruteni